Elena Cakmakoska (born 16 July 1990) is a Macedonian footballer who plays as a goalkeeper for 1. liga club ŽFK Kočani. She has been a member of the North Macedonia women's national team.

References

1990 births
Living people
Women's association football goalkeepers
Macedonian women's footballers
North Macedonia women's international footballers